The Corpus Christi Professorship of the Latin Language and Literature, also known simply as the Corpus Christi Professorship of Latin and previously as the Corpus Professorship of Latin, is a chair in Latin literature at Corpus Christi College, University of Oxford. The chair was created after the Oxford University Act of 1854.

List of Corpus Christi Professors of Latin

 1854–1869: John Conington; first incumbent
 1870–1878: Edwin Palmer
 1878–1893: Henry Nettleship
 1893–1913: Robinson Ellis
 1913–1934: Albert Curtis Clark
 1935–1953: Eduard Fraenkel
 1953–1970: Sir Roger Mynors
 1970–1992: Robin Nisbet
 1992–2001: Michael Winterbottom
 2002–2006: Philip Hardie
 2008–present: Tobias Reinhardt

References

 
Latin, Corpus Christi
Latin, Corpus Christi, Oxford
Lists of people associated with the University of Oxford
Corpus Christi College, Oxford